Chelan may refer to:

in Washington State, United States
Chelan (tribe), Colville Indian Reservation Native Americans
Chelan, Washington
Chelan County, Washington
Lake Chelan AVA, Washington wine region in Chelan County
Chelan River
Lake Chelan, Washington
Lake Chelan State Park
Lake Chelan National Recreation Area
Lake Chelan Dam
Lake Chelan-Sawtooth Wilderness
Chelan Mountains
MV Chelan, a passenger ferry in Washington State

elsewhere
Chelan-e Olya, a village in East Azerbaijan Province, Iran
Chelan-e Sofla, a village in East Azerbaijan Province, Iran
Chelan, Lorestan, a village in Lorestan Province, Iran
Chillán, in Chile.

Other uses
Chelan cherry, a hybrid cherry developed in Washington State